Death of a Dynasty is a 2003 American comedy film. It is a satire of the hip hop music industry, centered on Roc-A-Fella Records, and stars Ebon Moss-Bachrach, Capone, and Damon Dash. It also features cameo appearances by celebrities such as Jay-Z, Mariah Carey, Chloë Sevigny, Master P, Flavor Flav, and Carson Daly.

Production and release
It premiered at the Tribeca Film Festival in 2003 and was also shown at the Cannes Film Festival. The film was not released to theaters in the United States until 2005. It was co-produced by Roc-A-Fella Films and distributed by TLA Releasing.

Damon Dash directed the film and Adam Moreno wrote its screenplay. The film was made in dedication to singer Aaliyah who was dating Damon Dash before her death on August 25, 2001.

Cast
 Ebon Moss-Bachrach as Dave Katz
 Kevin Hart as P-Diddy / Cop 1 / Dance Coach / Hyper Rapper / H. Lector
 Capone Lee as Damon Dash
 Rob Stapleton as Jay-Z / Bootlegger 1 / Hot Boy 1 / "Dre" / A1 / Gay Guy
 Rashida Jones as Layna Hudson
 Devon Aoki as "Picasso"
 Charlie Murphy as Dick James / Dukey Man / Sock Head
 Damon Dash as "Harlem"
 Tony T. Roberts as Town Car Driver / Host
 Loon as Turk Stevens
 Stephanie Raye as Monica
 Beanie Sigel as Charles "Sandman" Patterson / Himself
 Funkmaster Flex  as Biggs / Angry Blackman
 Chloë Sevigny as Sexy Woman #1
 Kari Wuhrer as Sexy Woman #2
 Jamie-Lynn Sigler as Sexy Woman #3
 Lorraine Bracco Enchante R&B Singer #2
 Duncan Sheik as Well-Dressed Man
 Andrew Kling as The Magician
 Ed Lover as himself
 Doctor Dré as himself
 Carson Daly as himself
 Walt Frazier as himself
 Rell as himself
 Jay-Z as himself
 Cam'ron as himself
 Mark Ronson as himself
 M.O.P. as Themselves
 State Property as Themselves
 Master P as himself 
 Mariah Carey as herself
 Riddick Bowe as himself
 Russell Simmons as himself

External links 
 
 

2003 films
2003 comedy films
American comedy films
American independent films
2000s hip hop films
Films directed by Damon Dash
2000s English-language films
2000s American films